was a Japanese sprinter. He competed in the men's 800 metres and the men's 4 × 400 metres relay events at the 1956 Summer Olympics. He served as the coach for the Waseda University track and field team for 19 years starting in 1984.

References

1934 births
Athletes (track and field) at the 1956 Summer Olympics
Japanese male sprinters
Japanese male middle-distance runners
Olympic athletes of Japan
Place of birth missing
2012 deaths
20th-century Japanese people